Umagang Kay Ganda (also known as UKG) was a Philippine morning show that aired on ABS-CBN from June 25, 2007, to May 5, 2020. Prior to broadcast stoppage and the COVID-19 pandemic, the program was aired every weekday mornings from 5:00AM to 8:00AM on the network's Umaganda morning block. It also aired worldwide via TFC. The program was ABS-CBN's longest-running morning show.

Format
The main ingredient in this morning show was audience interaction and participation. In line with the format, they aired their show from Club O (formerly Dish) in the ABS-CBN compound to make the show more accessible to the audience. The program included live traffic points from six key points in Metro Manila, as well as occasional regional news.

Broadcast
In some provinces at 7:00AM, ABS-CBN Regional Network Group would cut this program mid-way (without any notice) to air sixty minutes of provincial morning programming. Each local morning program, produced by their respective news departments, features news and features related to its target regional audience. Due to the network's shutdown, these regional programs were then aired on their respective Facebook pages and YouTube at 7:00AM until their last broadcasts aired on August 28, 2020.
 Baguio/Dagupan (Northern Luzon) - Bagong Morning Kapamilya
 Naga City/Legazpi (Bicol) - Marhay na Aga Kapamilya
 Iloilo (Western Visayas) - Panay Sikat
 Bacolod (Western Visayas) - The Morning Show
 Cebu (Central Visayas) - Maayong Buntag Kapamilya
 Tacloban (Eastern Visayas) - Maupay nga Aga Kapamilya
 Cagayan de Oro/Iligan/Butuan (Northern Mindanao) - Pamahaw Espesyal
 Davao (Southern Mindanao) - Maayong Buntag Mindanao
 General Santos/Cotabato (South Central Mindanao) - Magandang Umaga South Central Mindanao
 Zamboanga (Western Mindanao) - Buenos Dias Zamboanga

History
Umagang Kay Ganda premiered on June 25, 2007, at 5:15AM, replacing Magandang Umaga, Pilipinas. The original hosts include Edu Manzano, Pinky Webb, Lucky Mercado, Anthony Taberna, Alex Santos, Winnie Cordero, Donita Rose, Zenaida Seva, Ogie Diaz, Kim Atienza, Bernadette Sembrano, and Rica Peralejo.

Edu Manzano and Ogie Diaz left the program more than two years later. Manzano was running for Vice President, while Diaz was concentrating on hosting Entertainment Live.

On May 11, 2009, Umagang Kay Ganda launched "Boto Mo iPatrol Mo Ako Ang Simula" in preparation for the 2010 Philippine elections.

On July 13, 2009, Ginger Conejero and Atom Araullo separately joined the program, filling the vacancy by the departure of Manzano and Diaz.

On October 21, 2009, Kim Atienza left the program to join the talent competition program Showtime (later known as It's Showtime) as one of the hosts.

On March 22, 2010, Andre Felix, Bekimon, and Phoemela Baranda joined the program as hosts. The same year, Araullo left the show to concentrate on field reporting.

On February 7, 2011, the program was reformatted, with Iya Villania, Jeffrey Tam, and Miss Universe 2010 fourth runner-up Venus Raj joining the program to replace Sembrano, Peralejo, Conejero and Bekimon. On August 1 of the same year, Bernadette Sembrano replaced Webb after the former's six-month hiatus from the show.                
                                 
On January 30, 2012, Bianca Gonzalez replaced Donita Rose (who left the show to train as a professional chef), while Anthony Taberna and his Dos Por Dos co-host Gerry Baja joined the program as hosts.

On June 4, 2012, comedian-actor Ariel Ureta joined the program as one of the new hosts.

On January 28, 2013, Jorge Cariño joined the program replacing Santos, while Araullo returned to the show after three years.

On February 10, 2014, Umagang Kay Ganda shortened its timeslot from 5:00AM to 7:30AM to give way for the airing extension of talk show Kris TV.

On October 2, 2015, Bernadette Sembrano left the program to focus on TV Patrol.

On October 23, 2015, ANC ended its simulcast for Umagang Kay Ganda in preparation for the major revamp of the channel's programming, logo and imaging. The timeslot was replaced by Mornings @ ANC and Early Edition.

On June 20, 2016, Umagang Kay Ganda brings back its original three-hour runtime from 5:00AM to 8:00AM.

On September 15, 2017, Atom Araullo left the program (following his departure from ABS-CBN) due to his decision to return to GMA Network. The next year, Kori Quintos and Jeff Canoy joined the show replacing Araullo and former PAGASA weatherman Alvin Pura.

On April 2, 2018, Umagang Kay Ganda switched to high definition format, along with the other ABS-CBN News programs.

On July 29, 2019, Canoy officially became part of UKG as a permanent co-host after filling-in for Araullo.

On March 18, 2020, Umagang Kay Ganda was temporarily replaced by the simulcast of DZMM TeleRadyo on the show's timeslot for the first time in years as provisional programming. Gerry Baja's Garantisadong Balita aired at 5-6am, followed by Noli de Castro's Kabayan (6-7am; 7:30-8am), and the tag team of Ted Failon and Noli de Castro in morning newscast Radyo Patrol Balita Alas-Siyete at 7-7:30am. The program returned to air on May 4, though it began at 6:00 am rather than 4:55 am as DZMM's Garantisadong Balita remained on air. However, due to the shutdown of ABS-CBN on the evening of May 5, 2020, caused by a cease-and-desist order from the National Telecommunications Commission after its legislative franchise expired the day prior, the program continued broadcasting as Umagang Kwentuhan on Facebook Live the day after until June 30, 2020. The program was formally cancelled on July 15, 2020, when the abolition of the network's Current Affairs division became official as a result of the denial of ABS-CBN's legislative broadcast franchise five days prior.

Hosts

Final hosts

Main hosts
 Winnie Cordero  
 Ariel Ureta 
 Amy Perez 
 Jorge Cariño 
 Tina Marasigan 
 Gretchen Ho 
 Ariella Arida  
 Jeff Canoy 
 Kori Quintos

Co-hosts
 Bryan Termulo 
 Hanz Cua 
 Marlo Mortel 
 K Brosas 
 Long Mejia 
 Dawn Chang 
 Tommy Esguerra 
 KaladKaren Davila 
 Lady Pipay Navarro 
 Jackque Gonzaga 
 Isabela Vinzon 
 Justin Cuyugan 
 Jeremy Glinoga

Guest and featured hosts
 Robi Domingo 
 Hashtags Members 
 Clarence Delgado 
 Mutya Orquia 
 Dominic Roque 
 Arron Villaflor 
 Marco Masa 
 Eric Nicolas 
 Upgrade (boyband group) 
 Pia Gutierrez 
 Adrian Ayalin 
 Renee Salud 
 Jasmin Romero 
 Cast of Team Yey! 
 Pat Reyes 
 Roxy Montealegre 
 Jeffrey Hernaez

Former hosts
 Lucky Mercado 
 Ogie Diaz  (now currently as a talent manager & also currently as a TV host)
 Edu Manzano 
 Kim Atienza 
 Zenaida Seva 
 Pinky Webb 
 Rica Peralejo  (now married)
 Donita Rose 
 Alex Santos 
 Bernadette Sembrano 
 Anthony Taberna 
 Ginger Conejero 
 Atom Araullo 
 Phoemela Baranda 
 Andrei Felix 
 Rico J. Puno  (deceased)
 Venus Raj 
 Iya Villania 
 Bianca Gonzalez 
 Gerry Baja 
 Zen Hernandez 
 Doris Bigornia 
 Melai Cantiveros 
 Ella Cruz 
 Alvin Pura 
 Sam Shoaf 
 Martin Javier

Segments
Final Segments 
 Umagang Balita: A two-part news bulletin, competing with two other morning news bulletins including Unang Hirits segment Unang Balita on GMA Network.
 6:00 A.M. - bulletin featuring national, international, regional, and showbiz news; anchored by Anthony Taberna, Amy Perez, Jorge Carino, and Jeff Canoy. This is considered as the main news bulletin of the morning show.
 7:00 A.M. - bulletin featuring more national, international and regional news.
 Showbiz Balita: Entertainment news segment anchored by Amy Perez.
 Eh Kasi Lalaki: Hosted by Anthony Taberna and Jorge Cariño.
 Umagang Kay Sarap: Recipe of the day.
 Ano Ba Yan?'''''

Controversy

Taberna's remarks on rape victim
On February 19, 2018, a news report of a 19-year-old girl was delivered; she was allegedly gang-raped after meeting up with someone she was chatting with online. In the background, however, Anthony Taberna's voice can be heard, saying, "This is just remarkable. It’s not the first time that this happened. There have been so many incidents like this of eyeball meet-ups. What’s more dangerous is you not only go to that eyeball meet-up, you even went out for a drink. That’s the problem, that’s the hardest of all, especially since you’re drinking out with an all-male group." Later, seemingly cutting off Jeff Canoy, Taberna was heard saying, "No. The truth is it’s easy to say that to men. Excuse me in so far as the victim is concerned, the one who must be given justice. But this should be a warning for future incidents. If you’re a woman, don’t enter a hole of evil-doers."

Accolades

See also
 List of programs broadcast by ABS-CBN

References

External links
 

ABS-CBN News and Current Affairs shows
ABS-CBN news shows
ABS-CBN original programming
Breakfast television in the Philippines
2010s Philippine television series
2020s Philippine television series
2007 Philippine television series debuts
2020 Philippine television series endings
Filipino-language television shows
Television productions suspended due to the COVID-19 pandemic